Mohri Sharif (Urdu موہری شریف) is a village in Tehsil Kharian, in the Gujrat District of Punjab, Pakistan. It lies midway between Lahore and Islamabad. Mohri Sharif and Kharian Tehsil have many of its population settled in European countries.

The most famous place in Mohri Sharif is the shrine of Murshid-e Kamil, Qibla Aalam Khawaja Sufi Nawab uDeen, and Qayyum e Punjam Al-Haaj Khawaja Mohammad Masoom.
Qibla e Aalam Sufi Nawab u Deen migrated to Mohri Sharif on 7 March 1931 following the word of his Sheikh. In the beginning he settled in the western part of Mohri Sharif. During that time, the landlord (Raja) of Mohri Sharif and his mother requested Sufi Nawab u Deen to accept their land in the eastern part of the town for Darbar's construction. He refused to take the land. Raja sahib insisted and offered a deal. If the distance between the house of Sufi Nawab uDeen's sheikh Hafiz Abdul Kareem and his darbar is same as the distance between Sufi Nawab uDeen's house and the proposed darbar site then Sufi Nawab u Deen must accept the land as Allah's will. Therefore, after measuring the distance, it turned out the distance is the same. Sufi Nawab uDeen accepted the land, considering it to be Allah's will.

The surface of new proposed land was irregular and bumpy. It was quite hard work to make it smooth. Sufi Nawab u Deen and his companions constructed a majestic Jammiah Mosque, and even today a commanding tomb of Sufi Nawab u Deen is present in Mohri Sharif, where million of people visit every year. Darbar  is now under the control of Government of Pakistan.

Overview of Darbar Sharif 
There is grand three-way entrance to the shrine of Sufi Nawab uDeen and Khawaja Mohammad Masoom. The shrine has a central dome with a huge chandelier in the middle. Walls of the shrine are decorated with Quranic verses similar to Mughal-style architecture. Outside the shrine there are twenty arches, creating a grand entrance towards the tomb.
Sufi Nawab uDeen proposed place of his grave near Shukriya Masjid. Khawaja Mohammad Masoom requested a location near the Jamiah Mosque so that a tomb could be created within the Darbar-e-Aalia Mohri Sharif. Sufi Nawab uDeen accepted his request. Therefore, he chose the southern part of Jamiah Mosque for his shrine.

Notable People 

 Qibla Aalam Khawaja Sufi Nawab uDeen
 Qayyum e Punjam Al-Haaj Khawaja Mohammad Masoom
 Ismat Beg  (mathematician and researcher)
 Basharat Ali (drink maker)

Quranic Scripture 
Mian Mahboob Ahmad (Chief Justice High Court Lahore) presented 30th part (para) of Quran which weighs 40 kg, inscription by Madina Quran Company Lahore. World-famous calligrapher Khursheed Aalam Gohar provided his calligraphy services in this script. This sacred script is placed for pilgrims to view in the tomb of Sufi Nawab uDeen and Khawaja Mohammad Masoom in Darbar-e-Aalia Mohri Sharif..

Jamiah Masjid Zareen Zarbakht 

Sufi Nawab uDeen constructed a mosque in Darbar-e-Aalia Mohri Sharif in 1963 and named the mosque Masjid Zareen Zarbakht. The mosque was extended in 1989 after Sufi Nawab uDeen died due to increase in pilgrims’ visit and accommodation. Khawaja Mohammad Masoom supervised the extension himself. Masjid Zareen Zarbakht is eighty feet long and thirty feet wide. In the middle of the mosque there is a marvellous dome in which ninety-nine names of Allah are carved in Mughal-style architecture. World-famous calligrapher Khursheed Aalam Gohar spent his precious time carving and engraving some of the best art pieces for the mosque's decoration. His work has given the appeal to mosque as it is built with jewels. There are wide verandas around the mosque with arches on the entrance. The mosque has a huge courtyard which has a marble floor. There is an eighty-foot-tall minaret built with the mosque which is visible from big distance away from the mosque.

Shukriya Masjid 

Sufi Nawab uDeen started construction of another mosque near Darbar-e-Aalia Mohri Sharif and named the mosque as Shukriya Mosque. This mosque is built on top of a hill. While explaining significance of the mosque, he mentioned anyone who will pray Nafil prayer in this mosque for fulfilment of certain desire will get it fulfilled.
Sufi Nawab uDeen allowed anyone of his spiritual students who wish to be buried in Mohri Sharif shall be buried in the graveyard of Shukriya Masjid. Many of his spiritual students have been buried in the graveyard since then.

Langar Khana 

In Darbar-e-Aalia Mohri Sharif to handle meals for daily routine and at major events such as annual Urs and congregations a grand langar khana has been constructed beside Darbar sharif. The grand facility has enough equipment and storage area to make meal for 100,000 people at the same time. Langar khana also has facility for pilgrims to stay overnight in the events of Urs or Milad -u- Nabi congregations.

Hoz e Shafa 

Hoz e Shafa has gone through another phase of renovation in 2008. Khawaja Mohammad Zubair renovated Hoz e Shafa fully with placing marble stones within and around the pool. This has uplifted the look and feel of the pool.

Surrounding Villages 

 Choa Rajgan

 Sadwal Chibban
 Mandeer
 Kotha
 Kalas

External links 
 

Populated places in Gujrat District
Urdu